The Slow Club is the name of a music project founded in 2004 by the Austrian musicians Hansi Lang, Thomas Rabitsch and Wolfgang Schlögl.

The genre of the produced music is related to jazz, which has - in the case of The Slow Club - a very strong influence of electronic dance music.

Discography

EPs 
 "Welcome to the Slow Club" (2004)

Albums 
 This Is the Slow Club (2005)
 House of Sleep (2008)

External links 
 Plattenlabel - The Slow Club

Austrian jazz ensembles
2004 establishments in Austria
Musical groups established in 2004
Austrian electronic music groups